Samuel Morgan (born 7 August 1950) is a Jamaican cricketer. He played in twenty-two first-class matches for the Jamaican cricket team from 1969 to 1974.

See also
 List of Jamaican representative cricketers

References

External links
 

1950 births
Living people
Jamaican cricketers
Jamaica cricketers
Cricketers from Kingston, Jamaica